The  is a Shintō shrine in the Takata neighborhood of the town of  Ichikawamisato, Nishiyatsushiro District in Yamanashi Prefecture, Japan. It is one of two shrines which vie for the title of ichinomiya of the former Kai Province. The main festival of the shrine is held annually on November 3.

Enshrined kami
The primary kami at the Ichinomiya Sengen Jinja is:
, the daughter of 

The secondary kami of the shrine are:
, the grandson of Amaterasu, and great-grandfather of Emperor Jimmu, consort of Konohanasakuya-hime
,son of Konohanasakuya-hime and Ninigi.

History
The foundation of the Ichinomiya Sengen Jinja predates the historical period. Per shrine tradition, it was established in reign of the semi-legendary Emperor Keikō (reigned 71 – 130 AD), to placate Mount Fuji after a huge eruption. In favor of this shine's claims are its location (in an area which was named "Ichinomiya") and the fact that the Fuefuki area did not really develop as the center of the province until under the Takeda clan in the Muromachi period. The shrine in Ichikawamisato received stipends from the Takeda clan, and under Tokugawa Ieyasu received territory, tax relief for the use of bamboo and trees on shrine territory. The exiled  Imperial Prince Priest Ryōjun, the eighth son of Emperor Go-Yōzei was sent to this shrine in 1643.The current Honden of the shrine dates from 1703. 

During the post-Meiji restoration system of State Shinto, the shrine was officially designated a village shrine, in the Modern system of ranked Shinto shrines. 

The shrine is a 12-minute walk  from Ichikawa-Daimon Station on the JR East Minobu Line.

Gallery

Cultural Properties

Important Cultural Properties
, Eastern Wu. This bronze mirror was recovered from the nearby Toriiharakitsunezuka Kofun burial mound. The mirror has an engraving around its rim, giving the Chinese Regnal year of 238 AD, a date corresponding to then Three Kingdoms period of Chinese history. It is the earliest positively dated mirror in Japan and raises the intriguing possibility that trade existed between proto-Japanese Kofun period states and the mainland of Asia during the Kofun period. The mirror was designated an National Important Cultural Property on June 6, 1979.

See also
 List of Shinto shrines
 Ichinomiya
 Asama Shrine

References

External links

Official site of the shrine

Shinto shrines in Yamanashi Prefecture
 Ichikawamisato, Yamanashi
Kai Province
Ichinomiya
Important Cultural Properties of Japan